Vladislavas Zybaila (born 17 January 1975) is a Lithuanian cross-country skier. He competed at the 1998 Winter Olympics and the 2002 Winter Olympics.

References

1975 births
Living people
Lithuanian male cross-country skiers
Olympic cross-country skiers of Lithuania
Cross-country skiers at the 1998 Winter Olympics
Cross-country skiers at the 2002 Winter Olympics
Sportspeople from Vilnius